5 Lacertae (5 Lac) is a spectroscopic binary in the constellation Lacerta. Its apparent magnitude is 4.36.

5 Lacertae is a slow irregular variable star with a small amplitude.  Photometry from the Hipparcos satellite showed brightness changes between Hipparcos magnitudes 4.39 and 4.56 with no clear periodicity.  It was given the variable star designation V412 Lacertae in 1999 in a special name-list dedicated to variables detected from Hipparcos.

The spectrum of 5 Lacertae clearly indicates both a hot component and a cooler component, recognised even in early spectra.  Published spectral types for the brighter cool component vary from K4 to M0, with a luminosity class of giant or supergiant.  The hotter star is generally classed as a relatively unevolved late B or early A star, but an automated classification program gave it a spectral class of B2V.

Radial velocity variations in the absorption lines from the two separate stars have been measured to determine the orbit.  This has an unusually long period of almost 42 years.  The two stars have an eccentric orbit with a projected axis of about 15 au.

References

Lacerta (constellation)
K-type supergiants
B-type main-sequence stars
Slow irregular variables
Spectroscopic binaries
Lacertae, 05
Lacertae, V412
Durchmusterung objects
111022
8572
213310 1